Vandit Bhatt (born August 4, 1984) is an American actor, best known for his portrayal of Kevin in the NBC sitcom The Michael J. Fox Show and as Jagdeep Patel in the third season of the ABC thriller Quantico.

Life and career

Bhatt was born in Hyderabad, India and later moved to Fort Myers, Florida, when he was young. During his formative years, he attended Fort Myers Senior High School. After graduation, he commenced his studies at the University of Central Florida. Later, he obtained an undergraduate degree and started touring with multiple theatre companies.

In 2010, Bhatt made his acting debut in the NBC drama series Mercy. Following on from his first role, Bhatt won other roles on a variety of TV shows including Madam Secretary, Younger and The Michael J. Fox Show. In 2017, Bhatt starred as Young Harris in the comedy drama film Ripped, which was released in theaters on June 23, 2017.

On January 17, 2018, it was announced by Deadline that Bhatt would star in a recurring role as Jagdeep Patel in the third season of the ABC thriller Quantico.

From 2018–2019, Vandit starred as Rohan Kapoor in the NBC medical drama New Amsterdam.

Filmography

Film

Television

References

External links
 

1984 births
Living people
Indian emigrants to the United States
American male actors of Indian descent
Male actors from Florida
American male television actors
American male film actors